The Suppression of Religious Houses Act 1535 (27 Hen 8 c 28; 1536 in modern dating), also referred to as the Act for the Dissolution of the Lesser Monasteries and as the Dissolution of Lesser Monasteries Act, was an Act of the Parliament of England enacted by the English Reformation Parliament in February 1535/36. It was the beginning of the legal process by which King Henry VIII set about the Dissolution of the Monasteries.

Background
From the 14th century onwards, several popes had granted licences for the suppression of religious houses in England. In 1528 Cardinal Wolsey sequestrated Rumburgh Priory for funds to build his college at Ipswich.

The breakdown of relations between Henry VIII and the Church in Rome, prompted by his marriage to Anne Boleyn, resulted in the Statute in Restraint of Appeals of 1533, forbidding all appeals to the Pope in Rome on religious or other matters. Pope Clement VII responded by announcing Henry's provisional excommunication, and the hostility between the king and the pope escalated. In the words of John Burton's Monasticon Eboracense (1758) – 

One of the first practical results of the assumption of the highest spiritual powers by the king was the supervision by royal decree of the ordinary episcopal visitations, and the appointment of a layman — Thomas Cromwell — as the king's vicar-general in spirituals, with special authority to visit the monastic houses, and to bring them into line with the new order of things. A document, dated 21 January 1535, allows Cromwell to conduct the visit through "commissaries", as the minister is said to be at that time too busy with "the affairs of the whole kingdom." The men employed by Cromwell were chiefly Richard Layton and Thomas Leigh. The visitation seems to have been conducted systematically, and to have passed through three clearly defined stages. During the summer the houses in the West of England were subjected to examination; and this portion of the work came to an end in September, when Layton and Leigh arrived at Oxford and Cambridge respectively. In October and November the visitors changed the field of their labours to the eastern and southeastern districts; and in December we find Layton advancing through the midland counties to Lichfield, where he met Leigh, who had finished his work in the religious houses of Huntingdon and Lincolnshire. Thence they proceeded together to the north, and the city of York was reached on 11 January 1536. But with all their haste, to which they were urged by Cromwell, they had not proceeded very far in the work of their northern inspection before the meeting of Parliament. 
  
Parliament met on 4 February 1535/36 and received a digest of the report Valor Ecclesiasticus, a visitation of the monasteries of England commissioned by the King. Cromwell was then defeated in Parliament, with his plan to reform monasteries denied, and the Dissolution of the Monasteries, put forward by Thomas Audley, soon passed the Act.

The Act applied only to lesser houses "which have not in lands, tenements, rents, tithes, portions, and other hereditaments, above the clear yearly value of two hundred pounds", attacking such houses as dens of iniquity and proposing that those in them should be "committed to great and honourable monasteries of religion" and "compelled to live religiously".

Preamble
The preamble of the Act states –

Effect
The main effect of the Act was to expropriate the lesser religious houses to the King, who (in the words of the Act) "shall have to him and to his heirs all and singular such monasteries, abbeys, and priories, which at any time within one year next before the making of this Act have been given and granted to his majesty by any abbot, prior, abbess, or prioress, under their convent seals, or that otherwise have been suppressed or dissolved... to have and to hold all and singular the premises, with all their rights, profits, jurisdictions, and commodities, unto the king's majesty, and his heirs and assigns for ever, to do and use therewith his and their own wills, to the pleasure of Almighty God, and to the honour and profit of this realm".

This section includes a retrospective effect, regularising suppressions of houses which had already taken place.

Consequences
The Act, and the many dissolutions which followed in its wake, was the principal cause of the Pilgrimage of Grace, a rebellion which broke out at Louth in Lincolnshire in October 1536. An army numbering about 30,000 men gathered, and King Henry ordered the Duke of Norfolk, Duke of Suffolk, and Lord Shrewsbury to take action. But he had no standing army, and the rebels were looked on favourably. So peace had to be negotiated, the demand to restore the monasteries was conceded, a new parliament was to be called, and the rebels were promised free pardons. After they had dispersed and gone home, Henry broke his word. The rebel leaders were arrested and put on trial, and several hundred were executed. Bigod's rebellion then followed, also unsuccessful.

Repeals
Sections 17 and 18 were repealed by section 11 of 21 James I, c. 28. Sections 4 to 6, 8 to 12, and 14 were repealed by section 1 of, and Schedule 1 to, the Statute Law Revision Act 1948. And finally the whole Act, so far as extant, was repealed by section 1 of, and Part II of the Schedule to, the Statute Law (Repeals) Act 1969.

See also
Dissolution of the Monasteries
List of monasteries dissolved by Henry VIII of England
Suppression of Religious Houses Act 1539

Notes

References
Halsbury's Statutes,
The Statutes Revised, Volume I (3rd edition, HMSO, 1950), pp. 186–190

1536 in law
1536 in England
Acts of the Parliament of England concerning religion
Dissolution of the Monasteries
1536 in Christianity